Jane Fletcher (born August 1956) is an English writer of lesbian speculative fiction. Her The Walls of Westenfort won the Golden Crown Literary Society's 2005 "Sci-Fi / Fantasy / Horror / Paranormal / Speculative" award, and her The Empress and the Acolyte won its 2007 Speculative Fiction award. In 2009, she received The Alice B Readers Award for career achievement.

Her Temple Landfall  was shortlisted for the Science Fiction/Fantasy/Horror category of the 18th Lambda Literary Awards in 2006, and her Wolfsbane Winter was shortlisted for the same category of the  23rd Lambda Literary Awards in 2011. Her Lorimal's Chalice was shortlisted for the 2003 Gaylactic Spectrum Award winners and nominees for best novel.

Early life and education
Fletcher grew up in south east London, and has a degree in Physics (1980) from the University of Surrey.

Selected publications

The Celeano series
The Temple at Landfall (November 2005,), Original title: The World Celaeno Chose (November 1999, The Dimsdale Press )
The Walls of Westernfort (September 2005,)
Rangers at Roadsend (August 2005,), Original title: The Wrong Trail Knife (2003, Fortitude Press, Inc. )
Dynasty of Rogues (March 2007,)
Shadow of the Knife (February 2008,)

The Lyremouth Chronicles
The Exile and the Sorcerer (February 2006,)
The Traitor and the Chalice (June 2006,)
The Empress and the Acolyte (November 2006,)
The High Priest and the Idol (July 2009,)

Others
Wolfsbane Winter (July 2011,)
The Shewstone (2016,)
Isle of Broken Years (2018,)

References

External links

1956 births
Living people
English women novelists
English LGBT writers
Alumni of the University of Surrey